In mathematics, Friedrichs's inequality is a theorem of functional analysis, due to Kurt Friedrichs. It places a bound on the Lp norm of a function using Lp bounds on the weak derivatives of the function and the geometry of the domain, and can be used to show that certain norms on Sobolev spaces are equivalent. Friedrichs's inequality generalizes the Poincaré–Wirtinger inequality, which deals with the case k = 1.

Statement of the inequality
Let  be a bounded subset of Euclidean space  with diameter . Then

In the above
  denotes the Lp norm;
 α = (α1, ..., αn) is a multi-index with norm |α| = α1 + ... + αn;
 Dαu is the mixed partial derivative

See also
Poincaré inequality

References

Sobolev spaces
Inequalities
Linear functionals